Kuchumovo (Küsem) is a rural locality (a village) in Chishminsky Selsoviet, Chishminsky District, Bashkortostan, Russia. The population was 116 as of 2010. There are 5 streets.

Geography 
Kuchumovo is located 16 km south of Chishmy (the district's administrative centre) by road. Isakovka is the nearest rural locality.

References 

Rural localities in Chishminsky District